Pochepsky (masculine), Pochepskaya (feminine), or Pochepskoye (neuter) may refer to:
Pochepsky District, a district of Bryansk Oblast, Russia
Pochepsky Urban Administrative Okrug, an administrative division which the town of Pochep in Pochepsky District of Bryansk Oblast, Russia is incorporated as
Pochepskoye Urban Settlement, a municipal formation which Pochepsky Urban Administrative Okrug in Pochepsky District of Bryansk Oblast, Russia is incorporated as
Pochepskoye (rural locality), a rural locality (a selo) in Voronezh Oblast, Russia